Max Gomez is an American singer-songwriter and musician based in Taos, New Mexico. He has been compared to Jackson Browne and John Prine because of his seasoned blend of Americana and folk.

Biography 
Gomez's father is of Portuguese and Spanish descent. His mother is of Scottish and Irish ancestry. He grew up in the mountains of northern New Mexico. The youngest of five brothers, Gomez spent his childhood fly fishing in New Mexico and exploring the mountains of Kansas where his parents own a farm. At 18 Gomez moved to Los Angeles to pursue his career in music. Not yet 30 years old and two albums under his belt, Gomez also co-founded and produces the annual Red River Folk Festival in Red River, New Mexico which hosts artists like James McMurtry, The Secret Sisters, Shannon McNally, and Jim Lauderdale, and Robert Mirabal.

Music career 
As a child, Gomez was influenced by the country and blues sounds of Johnny Cash and Big Bill Broonzy. After getting a guitar as a Christmas present when he was 10 years old, Gomez started performing in local bars throughout New Mexico. Gomez caught the eye of Grammy Award nominee/ folk-rocker Shawn Mullins after sending Mullins some of his music through Myspace. The two soon collaborated, co-writing a handful of songs that would appear on Mullins' next two albums, and touring throughout the U.S. together as young Gomez built up a fan base opening for the musical veteran. It wasn't long before Gomez sealed a record deal with Nashville-based label New West Records and recorded his first album with producer Jeff Trott. Rule The World put Gomez on the charts, Esquire naming the title track one of the top 10 "Best New Songs" at the time. In 2016 Gomez reunited with A&R rep Gary Briggs (Brigadoon Records) to release his second album Me & Joe, produced by Grammy Award-winning engineer and producer Jim Scott.

Gomez has shared the stage with hundreds of highly revered Americana artists including Shawn Mullins, James McMurtry, Buddy Miller, Jim Lauderdale, Patty Griffin, and John Hiatt.

Discography

Albums

Singles

Music videos

Guest appearances

References

External links 
 

Americana musicians
1987 births
Living people
People from Taos, New Mexico
American musicians of Portuguese descent
American people of Spanish descent
American people of Irish descent
American people of Scottish descent